The In Instrumentals is an album by jazz trombonist and arranger Kai Winding recorded in 1965 for the Verve label.

Reception

The Allmusic review by Tony Wilds said "The In Instrumentals does not stick to the truly "in" mod tunes, nor does it do much with its standard pop and rock tunes. ...let's face it: the music manager of New York's Playboy Club may have been "in," but he wasn't exactly hip, at least not on this album".

Track listing
 "On Broadway" (Jerry Leiber, Mike Stoller, Cynthia Weil, Barry Mann) - 2:04
 "Yesterday" (John Lennon, Paul McCartney) - 2:43
 "You've Lost That Lovin' Feelin'" (Weil, Mann, Phil Spector) - 2:59
 "Georgia On My Mind" (Hoagy Carmichael, Stuart Gorrell) - 2:30
 "Looking Through the Eyes of Love" (Mann, Weil) -	2:40
 "Mohair Sam" (Dallas Frazier) - 2:18
 "Sign of the Times" (Kai Winding) - 2:29
 "You've Got Your Troubles" (Roger Cook, Roger Greenaway) - 2:46
 "I Know a Place" (Tony Hatch) - 2:31
 "Spanish Harlem" (Leiber, Spector) - 2:39
 "Anyone Who Had a Heart" (Burt Bacharach, Hal David) - 2:29
 "Foxy" (Winding) - 2:06
Recorded in NYC on September 9, 1965 (tracks 1 & 7), September 23, 1965 (tracks 5, 6, 9 & 12) and September 28, 1965 (tracks 3, 4, 8, 10 & 11)

Personnel 
Kai Winding - trombone, arranger, conductor
John Frosk, Irv Markowitz, Joe Shepley - trumpet, flugelhorn
Wayne Andre, Jimmy Cleveland, Bill Watrous - trombone
Tony Studd - bass trombone
Charles de Angelis - flute, clarinet, alto saxophone, tenor saxophone
Gene Orloff, Max Pollikoff, Paul Winter - violin
Al Brown, David Mankowitz - viola
Peter Makas, George Ricci, Sol Shapiro - cello
Jerry Ragovoy - piano
Paul Griffin - piano, organ, harpsichord
Everett Barksdale, Al Gorgoni, Bill Suyker - guitar
Russ Savakus - electric bass
Gary Chester - drums
Jack Jennings - percussion
Don Sebesky (tracks 8 & 11), Gary Sherman (tracks 1-5, 9 & 10) - arranger, conductor

References 

1965 albums
Verve Records albums
Kai Winding albums
Albums produced by Creed Taylor
Albums arranged by Don Sebesky
Albums conducted by Don Sebesky